Vladimir Nikolaevich Artemov (born 7 December 1964) is a former Russian gymnast, Olympic champion and world champion who competed for the Soviet Union. He is considered to be one of the greatest parallel bars workers of all time.

He was born in Vladimir.

Artemov competed at the 1988 Summer Olympics in Seoul where he received gold medals in horizontal bar, parallel bars, all-around individual and team combined exercises.

World championships
Artemov won a gold medal in parallel bars at the 1983 World Artistic Gymnastics Championships in Budapest, and again at the 1987 World Artistic Gymnastics Championships in Rotterdam. He has received five silver medals and two bronze medals at the World Gymnastics Championships. He participated on the Soviet teams which won the team final in 1985, 1987 and 1989, and finished second in 1983.

Awards
Artemov was listed among the USSR top ten athletes of the year in 1988.

After the Olympics
Artemov immigrated to the United States in 1990, settling in Pennsylvania. However, he has mistakenly been identified as the father of current US gymnast Alexander (Sasha) Artemev. The two men are not related. Artemov currently lives in San Antonio, TX where he runs a gym with his wife Natalia.

See also

List of multiple Olympic gold medalists at a single Games

References

External links

1964 births
Living people
People from Vladimir, Russia
Soviet male artistic gymnasts
Gymnasts at the 1988 Summer Olympics
Olympic gymnasts of the Soviet Union
Olympic gold medalists for the Soviet Union
Olympic silver medalists for the Soviet Union
Olympic medalists in gymnastics
Medalists at the 1988 Summer Olympics
Medalists at the World Artistic Gymnastics Championships
Sportspeople from Vladimir Oblast